The Samsung Galaxy A40 is a mid-range Android smartphone developed and manufactured by Samsung Electronics. Running on the Samsung's Android 11-based One UI 3 software, the device was announced on March 19, 2019. It was released a month later in Europe on April 10, 2019.

The Samsung Galaxy A40 is a more compact variant of the Samsung Galaxy A30, being sold only in markets where the Galaxy A30 is not available.

Specifications

Hardware
The Samsung Galaxy A40 has a 5.9-inch Super AMOLED 'Infinity-U' display with an 85.5% screen-to-body ratio. It has dimensions of 144.4 mm by 69.2 mm by 7.9 mm and comes equipped with an Exynos 7904 chipset, 3100 mAh battery and a microSIM and dual nano SIM slot which supports VoLTE. The device is only available with 64GB of storage and 4GB of RAM and is expandable to up to 512GB of external storage via the microSD card slot.

Camera
The A40 is equipped with a dual rear camera arrangement with a 16 megapixel, f/1.7 aperture sensor as the main camera and an 'ultra-wide' 5 megapixels camera lens with an f/2.2 aperture as the second camera. The front camera is 25 megapixels.

The A40 has a rear-mounted LED flash as well as video recording.
Maximum video recording resolution is 2336x1080 pixels (Full mode). Audio recording with internal microphones is stereo. Audio recording with external USB microphones is supported but is mixed to mono.

Software
The device runs on the Android 11 operating system, with Samsung's One UI skin.

Samsung has released One UI 2.0 with Android 10 for Galaxy A40 in April 2020.

Samsung has released One UI 3.1, based on Android 11, in late March 2021.

Variants
All variants of the Samsung Galaxy A40 are dual-SIM.

SM-A405FD - Unknown
SM-A405FM - Russia
SM-A405FN - Europe, Ukraine, Caucasus, Kazakhstan, Uzbekistan
SM-A405S - South Korea (SK Telecom)
SM-A405FN is manufactured in Vietnam.

See also
Samsung Galaxy
Samsung Galaxy A series

References

External links
 

Samsung smartphones
Samsung Galaxy
Android (operating system) devices
Mobile phones introduced in 2019
Mobile phones with multiple rear cameras